This office existed until 1945, when the office of Lieutenant Governor of Georgia assumed the responsibilities of the Senate Presidency.

List of presidents

Lists of legislative speakers in the United States
Lists of state senators of the United States
Georgia (U.S. state) state senators
presidents of the Georgia State Senate